The impact of self-driving cars is anticipated to be wide-ranging on many areas of daily life. Self-driving cars have been the subject of significant research on their environmental, practical, and lifestyle consequences.

One significant predicted impact of self-driving cars is a substantial reduction in traffic collisions and resulting severe injuries or deaths. United States government estimates suggest 94% of traffic collisions are caused by human error, with a 2020 study estimating that making 90% of cars on US roads self-driving would save 25,000 lives per year. While this has significant benefits, other health downsides of self-driving cars are predicted; self-driving cars are suggested to worsen air pollution, noise pollution, and sedentary lifestyles, and may contribute to shortages of donor organs.

Self-driving cars are anticipated to increase productivity and housing affordability, as well as reclaim land used for parking. However, they are also predicted to cause greater energy use, traffic congestion and sprawl. The impact of self-driving cars on absolute levels of individual car use is not yet clear, with commentators alternatively predicting increases and decreases. Self-driving cars are one of several potential autonomous vehicles, and other forms of self-driving vehicles, such as self-driving buses, may decrease car use and congestion in ways self-driving cars are unlikely to.

The effect of self-driving cars on various employment fields is predicted to be wide-ranging. Impacts are anticipated on the healthcare, insurance, travel, and logistics fields. Auto insurance costs are expected to decrease, and the burden of cars on the healthcare system to reduce. Self-driving cars are predicted to have substantial and wide-ranging effects on transportation industries, with significant job losses in these fields.

Automobile industry 

The traditional automobile industry is subject to changes driven by technology and market demands. These changes include breakthrough technological advances and when the market demands and adopts new technology quickly. In the rapid advance of both factors, the end of the era of incremental change was recognized. When the transition is made to new technology, new entrants to the automotive industry present themselves, which can be distinguished as mobility providers such as Uber and Lyft, as well as tech giants such as Google and Nvidia.  As new entrants to the industry arise, market uncertainty naturally occurs due to the changing dynamics. For example, the entrance of tech giants, as well as the alliances between them and traditional car manufacturers causes a variation in the innovation and production process of autonomous vehicles. Additionally, the entrance of mobility providers has caused ambiguous user preferences. As a result of the rise of mobility providers, the number of vehicles per capita has flatlined. In addition, the rise of the sharing economy also contributes to market uncertainty and causes forecasters to question whether personal ownership of vehicles is still relevant as new transportation technology and mobility providers are becoming preferred among consumers.

To help reduce the possibility of safety issues, some companies have begun to open-source parts of their driverless systems. Udacity for instance is developing an open-source software stack, and some companies are having similar approaches.

Health 

According to a 2020 Annual Review of Public Health review of the literature, self-driving cars "could increase some health risks (such as air pollution, noise, and sedentarism); however, if properly regulated, AVs will likely reduce morbidity and mortality from motor vehicle crashes and may help reshape cities to promote healthy urban environments." Driving safety experts predict that once driverless technology has been fully developed, traffic collisions (and resulting deaths and injuries and costs) caused by human error, such as delayed reaction time, tailgating, rubbernecking, and other forms of distracted or aggressive driving should be substantially reduced. With the increasing reliance of autonomous vehicles on interconnectivity and the availability of big data which is made usable in the form of real-time maps, driving decisions can be made much faster in order to prevent collisions.

Numbers made available by the US government state that 94% of vehicle accidents are due to human failures. As a result, major implications for the healthcare industry become apparent. Numbers from the National Safety Council on killed and injured people on US roads multiplied by the average costs of a single incident reveal that an estimated US$500 billion loss may be imminent for the US healthcare industry when autonomous vehicles are dominating the roads. It is likely the anticipated decrease in traffic accidents will positively contribute to the widespread acceptance of autonomous vehicles, as well as the possibility to better allocate healthcare resources. If 90% of cars in the US became self-driving, for example, an estimated 25,000 lives would be saved annually. Lives saved by averting automobile crashes in the US has been valued at more than $200 billion annually.

Self-driving car would have the potential to save 10 million lives worldwide, per decade.

According to motorist website "TheDrive.com" operated by Time magazine, none of the driving safety experts they were able to contact was able to rank driving under an autopilot system at the time (2017) as having achieved a greater level of safety than traditional fully hands-on driving, so the degree to which these benefits asserted by proponents will manifest in practice cannot be assessed. Confounding factors that could reduce the net effect on safety may include unexpected interactions between humans and partly or fully automated vehicles, or between different types of a vehicle system; complications at the boundaries of functionality at each automation level (such as handover when the vehicle reaches the limit of its capacity); the effect of the bugs and flaws that inevitably occur in complex interdependent software systems; sensor or data shortcomings; and successful compromise by malicious interveners. Security problems include what an autonomous car might do if summoned to pick up the owner but another person attempts entry, what happens if someone tries to break into the car, and what happens if someone attacks the occupants, for example by exchanging gunfire.

Some believe that once automation in vehicles reaches higher levels and becomes reliable, drivers will pay less attention to the road. Research shows that drivers in automated cars react later when they have to intervene in a critical situation, compared to if they were driving manually. Depending on the capabilities of automated vehicles and the frequency with which human intervention is needed, this may counteract any increase in safety, as compared to all-human driving, that may be delivered by other factors.

An unexpected disadvantage of the widespread acceptance of autonomous vehicles would be a reduction in the supply of organs for donation.  In the US, for example, 13% of the organ donation supply comes from car crash victims.

Welfare 

According to a 2020 study, self-driving cars will increase productivity, and housing affordability, as well as reclaim land used for parking. However, self-driving cars will cause greater energy use, traffic congestion and sprawl. Automated cars could reduce labor costs; relieve travelers from driving and navigation chores, thereby replacing behind-the-wheel commuting hours with more time for leisure or work; and also would lift constraints on occupant ability to drive, distracted and texting while driving, intoxicated, prone to seizures, or otherwise impaired.

For the young, the elderly, people with disabilities, and low-income citizens, automated cars could provide enhanced mobility. The removal of the steering wheel—along with the remaining driver interface and the requirement for any occupant to assume a forward-facing position—would give the interior of the cabin greater ergonomic flexibility. Large vehicles, such as motorhomes, would attain appreciably enhanced ease of use.

The elderly and persons with disabilities (such as persons who are hearing-impaired, vision-impaired, mobility-impaired, or cognitively-impaired) are potential beneficiaries of adoption of autonomous vehicles; however, the extent to which such populations gain greater mobility from the adoption of AV technology depends on the specific designs and regulations adopted.

Children and teens, who are not able to drive a vehicle themselves in case of student transport, would also benefit of the introduction of autonomous cars. Daycares and schools are able to come up with automated pick-up and drop-off systems by car in addition to walking, cycling and busing, causing a decrease of reliance on parents and childcare workers.

The extent to which human actions are necessary for driving will vanish. Since current vehicles require human actions to some extent, the driving school industry will not be disrupted until the majority of autonomous transportation is switched to the emerged dominant design. It is plausible that in the distant future driving a vehicle will be considered as a luxury, which implies that the structure of the industry is based on new entrants and a new market. Self-driving cars would also exasperate existing mobility inequalities driven by the interests of car companies and technology companies while taking investment away from more equitable and sustainable mobility initiatives such as public transportation.

Urban planning 

According to a Wonkblog reporter, if fully automated cars become commercially available, they have the potential to be a disruptive innovation with major implications for society. The likelihood of widespread adoption is still unclear, but if they are used on a wide scale, policymakers face a number of unresolved questions about their effects.

One fundamental question is about their effect on travel behavior. Some people believe that they will increase car ownership and car use because it will become easier to use them and they will ultimately be more useful. This may, in turn, encourage urban sprawl and ultimately total private vehicle use. Others argue that it will be easier to share cars and that this will thus discourage outright ownership and decrease total usage, and make cars more efficient forms of transportation in relation to the present situation.

Policy-makers will have to take a new look at how infrastructure is to be built and how money will be allotted to build for automated vehicles. The need for traffic signals could potentially be reduced with the adoption of smart highways. Due to smart highways and with the assistance of smart technological advances implemented by policy change, the dependence on oil imports may be reduced because of less time being spent on the road by individual cars which could have an effect on policy regarding energy. On the other hand, automated vehicles could increase the overall number of cars on the road which could lead to a greater dependence on oil imports if smart systems are not enough to curtail the impact of more vehicles. However, due to the uncertainty of the future of automated vehicles, policymakers may want to plan effectively by implementing infrastructure improvements that can be beneficial to both human drivers and automated vehicles. Caution needs to be taken in acknowledgment to public transportation and that the use may be greatly reduced if automated vehicles are catered to through policy reform of infrastructure with this resulting in job loss and increased unemployment.

Other disruptive effects will come from the use of automated vehicles to carry goods. Self-driving vans have the potential to make home deliveries significantly cheaper, transforming retail commerce and possibly making hypermarkets and supermarkets redundant.  the US Department of Transportation defines automation into six levels, starting at level zero which means the human driver does everything and ending with level five, the automated system performs all the driving tasks. Also under the current law, manufacturers bear all the responsibility to self-certify vehicles for use on public roads. This means that currently as long as the vehicle is compliant within the regulatory framework, there are no specific federal legal barriers in the US to a highly automated vehicle being offered for sale. Iyad Rahwan, an associate professor in the MIT Media Lab said, "Most people want to live in a world where cars will minimize casualties, but everyone wants their own car to protect them at all costs." Furthermore, industry standards and best practice are still needed in systems before they can be considered reasonably safe under real-world conditions.

Traffic 

Additional advantages could include higher speed limits; smoother rides; and increased roadway capacity; and minimized traffic congestion, due to decreased need for safety gaps and higher speeds. Currently, maximum controlled-access highway throughput or capacity according to the US Highway Capacity Manual is about 2,200 passenger vehicles per hour per lane, with about 5% of the available road space is taken up by cars. One study estimated that automated cars could increase capacity by 273% (≈8,200 cars per hour per lane). These increases in highway capacity could have a significant impact in traffic congestion, particularly in urban areas, and even effectively end highway congestion in some places. The ability for authorities to manage traffic flow would increase, given the extra data and driving behavior predictability combined with less need for traffic police and even road signage.

Insurance 

Safer driving is expected to reduce the costs of vehicle insurance. The automobile insurance industry might suffer as the technology makes certain aspects of these occupations obsolete. As fewer collisions implicate less money spent on repair costs, the role of the insurance industry is likely to be altered as well. It can be expected that the increased safety of transport due to autonomous vehicles will lead to a decrease in payouts for the insurers, which is positive for the industry, but fewer payouts may imply a demand drop for insurances in general.

In order to accommodate such changes, the Automated and Electric Vehicles Act 2018 was introduced. While Part 2 deals with Electric Vehicles, Part 1 covers insurance provisions for automated vehicles.

Labor market

Driving-related jobs 
A direct impact of widespread adoption of automated vehicles is the loss of driving-related jobs in the road transport industry. There could be resistance from professional drivers and unions who are threatened by job losses. In addition, there could be job losses in public transit services and crash repair shops. A frequently cited paper by Michael Osborne and Carl Benedikt Frey found that automated cars would make many jobs redundant. The industry has, however created thousands of jobs in low-income countries for workers who train autonomous systems.

Taxis 

With the aforementioned ambiguous user preference regarding the personal ownership of autonomous vehicles, it is possible that the current mobility provider trend will continue as it rises in popularity. Established providers such as Uber and Lyft are already significantly present within the industry, and it is likely that new entrants will enter when business opportunities arise.

Energy and environmental impacts

Vehicle use
A review found that private autonomous vehicles may increase total travel, whereas autonomous buses may lead to reduced car use.

Vehicle automation can improve fuel economy of the car by optimizing the drive cycle, as well as increasing congested traffic speeds by an estimated 8%–13%. Reduced traffic congestion and the improvements in traffic flow due to widespread use of automated cars will translate into higher fuel efficiency, ranging from a 23%–39% increase, with the potential to further increase.  Additionally, self-driving cars will be able to accelerate and brake more efficiently, meaning higher fuel economy from reducing wasted energy typically associated with inefficient changes to speed. However, the improvement in vehicle energy efficiency does not necessarily translate to net reduction in energy consumption and positive environmental outcomes.

Alongside the induced demand, there may also be a reduction in the use of more sustainable modes, such as public or active transport. It is expected that convenience of the automated vehicles encourages the consumers to travel more, and this induced demand may partially or fully offset the fuel efficiency improvement brought by automation. Alongside the induced demand, there may also be a reduction in the use of more sustainable modes, such as public or active transport. Overall, the consequences of vehicle automation on global energy demand and emissions are highly uncertain, and heavily depends on the combined effect of changes in consumer behavior, policy intervention, technological progress and vehicle technology.

Production
By reducing the labor and other costs of mobility as a service, automated cars could reduce the number of cars that are individually owned, replaced by taxi/pooling and other car-sharing services. This would also dramatically reduce the size of the automotive production industry, with corresponding environmental and economic effects.

Indirect effects
The lack of stressful driving, more productive time during the trip, and the potential savings in travel time and cost could become an incentive to live far away from cities, where housing is cheaper, and work in the city's core, thus increasing travel distances and inducing more urban sprawl, raising energy consumption and enlarging the carbon footprint of urban travel. There is also the risk that traffic congestion might increase, rather than decrease. Appropriate public policies and regulations, such as zoning, pricing, and urban design are required to avoid the negative impacts of increased suburbanization and longer distance travel.

Since many autonomous vehicles are going to rely on electricity to operate, the demand for lithium batteries increases. Similarly, radar, sensors, lidar, and high-speed internet connectivity require higher auxiliary power from vehicles, which manifests as greater power draw from batteries. The larger battery requirement causes a necessary increase in the supply of these type of batteries for the chemical industry. On the other hand, with the expected increase of battery-powered (autonomous) vehicles, the petroleum industry is expected to undergo a decline in demand. As this implication depends on the adoption rate of autonomous vehicles, it is unsure to what extent this implication will disrupt this particular industry. This transition phase of oil to electricity allows companies to explore whether there are business opportunities for them in the new energy ecosystem. In 2020, Mohan, Sripad, Vaishnav & Viswanathan at Carnegie Mellon University found that the electricity consumption of all the automation technology, including sensors, computation, internet access as well as the increased drag from sensors causes up to a 15% impact on the range of an automated electric vehicle, therefore, implying that the larger battery requirement might not be as large as previously assumed.

Self-parking and parking space

Self-parking 

A study conducted by AAA Foundation for Traffic Safety found that drivers did not trust self-parking technology, even though the systems outperformed drivers with a backup camera. The study tested self-parking systems in a variety of vehicles (Lincoln MKC, Mercedes-Benz ML400 4Matic, Cadillac CTS-V Sport, BMW i3 and Jeep Cherokee Limited) and found that self-parking cars hit the curb 81% fewer times, used 47% fewer manoeuvres and parked 10% faster than drivers. Yet, only 25% of those surveyed said they would trust this technology.

Parking space 

Manually driven vehicles are reported to be used only 4–5% of the time, and being parked and unused for the remaining 95–96% of the time. Autonomous taxis could, on the other hand, be used continuously after they have reached their destination. This could dramatically reduce the need for parking space. This combined with the potential reduced need for road space due to improved traffic flow, could free up large amounts of land in urban areas, which could then be used for parks, recreational areas, buildings, among other uses; making cities more livable. Besides this, privately owned self-driving cars, also capable of self-parking would provide another advantage: the ability to drop off and pick up passengers even in places where parking is prohibited. This would benefit park and ride facilities.

Cybersecurity

Privacy 
The vehicles' increased awareness could aid the police by reporting on illegal passenger behaviour, while possibly enabling other crimes, such as deliberately crashing into another vehicle or a pedestrian. However, this may also lead to much-expanded mass surveillance if there is wide access granted to third parties to the large data sets generated.

Privacy could be an issue when having the vehicle's location and position integrated into an interface that other people have access to.  Moreover, they require a sensor-based infrastructure that would constitute an all-encompassing surveillance apparatus. This gives the car manufacturers and other companies the data needed to understand the user's lifestyle and personal preferences.

Terrorist scenarios 
There is the risk of terrorist attacks by automotive hacking through the sharing of information through V2V (Vehicle to Vehicle) and V2I (Vehicle to Infrastructure) protocols. Self-driving cars could potentially be loaded with explosives and used as bombs. According to legislation of US lawmakers, autonomous and self-driving vehicles should be equipped with defences against hacking.

Car repair 

As collisions are less likely to occur, and the risk for human errors is reduced significantly, the repair industry will face an enormous reduction of work that has to be done on the reparation of car frames. Meanwhile, as the generated data of the autonomous vehicle is likely to predict when certain replaceable parts are in need of maintenance, car owners and the repair industry will be able to proactively replace a part that will fail soon. This "Asset Efficiency Service" would implicate a productivity gain for the automotive repair industry.

Rescue, emergency response, and military 

The technique used in autonomous driving also ensures life savings in other industries. The implementation of autonomous vehicles with rescue, emergency response, and military applications has already led to a decrease in deaths. Military personnel use autonomous vehicles to reach dangerous and remote places on earth to deliver fuel, food and general supplies and even rescue people. In addition, a future implication of adopting autonomous vehicles could lead to a reduction in deployed personnel, which will lead to a decrease in injuries, since the technological development allows autonomous vehicles to become more and more autonomous. Another future implication is the reduction of emergency drivers when autonomous vehicles are deployed as fire trucks or ambulances. An advantage could be the use of real-time traffic information and other generated data to determine and execute routes more efficiently than human drivers. The time savings can be invaluable in these situations.

Interior design and entertainment 

With the driver decreasingly focused on operating a vehicle, the interior design and media-entertainment industry will have to reconsider what passengers of autonomous vehicles are doing when they are on the road. Vehicles need to be redesigned, and possibly even be prepared for multipurpose usage. In practice, it will show that travellers have more time for business and/or leisure. In both cases, this gives increasing opportunities for the media-entertainment industry to demand attention. Moreover, the advertisement business is able to provide location-based ads without risking driver safety.

Connected vehicle 

All cars can benefit from information and connections, but autonomous cars "Will be fully capable of operating without C-V2X." In addition, the earlier mentioned entertainment industry is also highly dependent on this network to be active in this market segment. This implies higher revenues for the telecommunication industry.

Hospitality industry and airlines 

Driver interactions with the vehicle will be less common within the near future, and in the more distant future, the responsibility will lie entirely with the vehicle. As indicated above, this will have implications for the entertainment- and interior design industry. For roadside restaurants, the implication will be that the need for customers to stop driving and enter the restaurant will vanish, and the autonomous vehicle will have a double function. Moreover, accompanied by the rise of disruptive platforms such as Airbnb that have shaken up the hotel industry, the fast increase of developments within the autonomous vehicle industry might cause another implication for their customer bases. In the more distant future, the implication for motels might be that a decrease in guests will occur, since autonomous vehicles could be redesigned as fully equipped bedrooms. The improvements regarding the interior of the vehicles might additionally have implications for the airline industry. In the case of relatively short-haul flights, waiting times at customs or the gate imply lost time and hassle for customers. With the improved convenience in future car travel, it is possible that customers might go for this option, causing a loss in customer bases for the airline industry.

References 

Technology assessments
self-driving